1525 Savonlinna, provisional designation , is an asteroid from the central region of the asteroid belt, approximately 12 kilometers in diameter. It was discovered on 18 September 1939, by Finnish astronomer Yrjö Väisälä at the Turku Observatory in southwestern Finland. It was later named after the eastern Finnish town Savonlinna.

Orbit and classification 

Savonlinna orbits the Sun in the central main-belt at a distance of 2.0–3.4 AU once every 4 years and 5 months (1,620 days). Its orbit has an eccentricity of 0.26 and an inclination of 6° with respect to the ecliptic.

Physical characteristics

Rotational period 

In October and December 2010, two rotational lightcurves of Savonlinna were obtained by Gordon Gartrelle at UND and the Palomar Transient Factory in California. Lightcurve analysis gave a divergent rotation period of 14.634 and 22.8406 hours with a brightness variation of 0.52 and 0.50 magnitude, respectively.

Diameter and albedo 

According to the surveys carried out by the Infrared Astronomical Satellite IRAS, and NASA's Wide-field Infrared Survey Explorer with its subsequent NEOWISE mission, Savonlinna measures between 11.73 and 12.23 kilometers in diameter and its surface has an albedo between 0.045 and 0.130. The Collaborative Asteroid Lightcurve Link derives an albedo of 0.084 and a diameter of 12.06 kilometers based on an absolute magnitude of 12.9. It also classifies the body as a S-type asteroid, despite its derived albedo.

Naming 

This minor planet was named for the eastern Finnish town Savonlinna, located in the heart of the Saimaa lake region. The official  was published by the Minor Planet Center on 20 February 1976.

References

External links 
 Asteroid Lightcurve Database (LCDB), query form (info )
 Dictionary of Minor Planet Names, Google books
 Asteroids and comets rotation curves, CdR – Observatoire de Genève, Raoul Behrend
 Discovery Circumstances: Numbered Minor Planets (1)-(5000) – Minor Planet Center
 
 

001525
Discoveries by Yrjö Väisälä
Named minor planets
19390918